This is a list of countries (and some territories) by the annual prevalence of opiates use as percentage of the population aged 15–64 (unless otherwise indicated). 

The primary source of information are the World Drug Report 2011 (WDR 2011) and the World Drug Report 2006 (WDR 2006), published by the United Nations Office on Drugs and Crime (UNODC). The indicator is the "annual prevalence" rate which is shown as the percentage of the youth and adult population who have consumed the drugs at least once in the past year. The largest producer of opiates in the world is Afghanistan to a total of 93% of the world's market.

The list does not include opioids, which is classified as a different drug under the World Drug Report 2011 list, which is considered "opiates and prescription opioids."

See also 
 Opium in Iran, highest per capita usage

References

External links 

Substance dependence
Opiates
Opiates abuse, List of countries by